Sølvhøj is a Danish surname.

List of people with the surname 

  (1919–1989), Danish politician
 Jakob Sølvhøj (born 1954), Danish politician

See also 
 Solhöjden

Danish-language surnames
Surnames of Danish origin